This is a list of winners and nominees of the Primetime Emmy Award for Outstanding Drama Series since its institution in 1951. The award goes to the producers of the series. The award is often cited as one of the "main awards" at the Emmys ceremonies.

History
Since its institution in 1951 the award has changed names many times in its history. It was first called Best Dramatic Show from 1951 to 1954, then Best Dramatic Series in 1955 and 1956. In 1957, no specific award for drama was given, but in 1958 the category was split into two separate categories, Best Dramatic Anthology Series, and Best Dramatic Series with Continuing Characters with a winner selected from each category. The following year, the category was differently split into two separate categories, Best Dramatic Series – Less Than One Hour. In 1960, the name was changed yet again to Outstanding Program Achievement in the Field of Drama; this name was kept from 1960 to 1964. In 1966, it had its sixth name change to Outstanding Dramatic Series or Outstanding Series-Drama; this was used from 1966 until recently, when it became Outstanding Drama Series.

In 1988, Rumpole of the Bailey (PBS) was initially nominated in the Outstanding Miniseries category but the Academy ruled that the nomination was not valid a few days later and later allowed the program to compete in the Outstanding Drama Series category.

Since 2000, every single winner has been a serial drama: The West Wing (2000–2003), The Sopranos (2004, 2007), Lost (2005), 24 (2006), Mad Men (2008–2011), Homeland (2012), Breaking Bad (2013–2014), Game of Thrones (2015–2016, 2018–2019), The Handmaid's Tale (2017), Succession (2020, 2022), and The Crown (2021). Since the advent of Hill Street Blues in 1981, every winner has had some serialized arcs with the exception of Law & Order. The majority of these shows have won between their first and fifth seasons. Only two shows' sixth seasons have won (both HBO shows): The Sopranos and Game of Thrones, two shows' seventh seasons have won: Law & Order and Game of Thrones and one show's eighth season has won: Game of Thrones.

Winners and nominations
The following tables, divided by decade, display the winners and nominees of the "Drama Series" award, according to the Primetime Emmy Awards database:

1950s

1960s

1970s

1980s

1990s

2000s

2010s

Programs with multiple wins

4 wins
 Game of Thrones (2 consecutive, twice)
 Hill Street Blues (consecutive)
 L.A. Law (3 consecutive)
 Mad Men (consecutive)
 The West Wing (consecutive)

3 wins
 The Defenders (consecutive)
 Dragnet (consecutive)
 Playhouse 90 (consecutive)
 Upstairs, Downstairs (2 consecutive)

2 wins
 Breaking Bad (consecutive)
 Cagney & Lacey (consecutive)
 Lou Grant (consecutive)
 Mission: Impossible (consecutive)
 Picket Fences (consecutive)
 The Practice (consecutive)
 The Sopranos
 Succession
 The United States Steel Hour (consecutive)

Programs with multiple nominations

11 nominations
 Law & Order

8 nominations
 Game of Thrones
 Mad Men

7 nominations
 ER
 The Sopranos
 Studio One
 The West Wing

6 nominations
 Better Call Saul
 Hill Street Blues
 L.A. Law
 NYPD Blue
 St. Elsewhere

5 nominations
 24
 Breaking Bad
 Downton Abbey
 Cagney & Lacey
 Columbo
 House of Cards
 Lou Grant

4 nominations
 Alfred Hitchcock Presents
 The Crown
 Dexter
 Dragnet
 The Handmaid's Tale
 Homeland
 House
 Lost
 Northern Exposure
 The Philco-Goodyear Television Playhouse
 The Practice
 Stranger Things
 thirtysomething
 This Is Us
 The X-Files

3 nominations
 Chicago Hope
 China Beach
 Climax!
 CSI: Crime Scene Investigation
 The Defenders
 Fame
 Family
 Foreign Intrigue
 Gunsmoke
 I Spy
 Ironside
 Magnum, P.I.
 Marcus Welby, M.D.
 Mission: Impossible
 Murder, She Wrote
 Naked City
 Ozark
 Playhouse 90
 Police Story
 Quantum Leap
 Robert Montgomery Presents
 The Rockford Files
 Six Feet Under
 The Streets of San Francisco
 Succession
 The United States Steel Hour
 Upstairs, Downstairs
 The Waltons

2 nominations
 The Americans
 The Avengers
 Baretta
 Beauty and the Beast
 Boardwalk Empire
 Boston Legal
 Celanese Theatre
 Dallas
 Damages
 The Dick Powell Show
 The Good Wife
 Grey's Anatomy
 I'll Fly Away
 Killing Eve
 Kojak
 Kraft Television Theatre
 The Mandalorian
 Maverick
 Moonlighting
 Picket Fences
 Pose
 Pulitzer Prize Playhouse
 Quincy, M.E.
 Racket Squad
 Star Trek
 The Untouchables
 Wagon Train
 Westworld
 The White Shadow

Total awards by network

 NBC – 21
 CBS – 18
 ABC – 9
 HBO/HBO Max – 8
 AMC – 6
 PBS – 4
 Fox – 1
 Hulu – 1
 KECA-TV – 1
 NET – 1
 Showtime – 1
 Netflix – 1

Notes

A: Saying Law & Order had no serialized arcs is potentially misleading. It's true that Law & Order is at its core a procedural, with only very lightly-serialized elements as a general rule. However, in its Emmy-winning seventh season, the show had a three-episode arc—"D-Girl", "Turnaround", and "Showtime"—concerning a high-profile murder case. In addition, the episode "Entrapment" was a sequel to season 3's "Conspiracy" .
B: The sixth season of The Sopranos was split into two parts. They are both considered season 6.
C: The fifth season of Breaking Bad was split into two parts. They are both considered season 5.
D: The seventh season of Mad Men was split into two parts. They are both considered season 7.

See also
 Primetime Emmy Award for Outstanding Comedy Series
 Golden Globe Award for Best Television Series – Drama
 Screen Actors Guild Award for Outstanding Performance by an Ensemble in a Drama Series
 Critics' Choice Television Award for Best Drama Series

References

General
 

Specific

External links
 Primetime Emmy® Awards
 Primetime Emmy® Awards History Database

Drama Series